The Charky (Çarkı), also known as Muolakaan (Муолакаан), is a river in the Republic of Sakha in Russia. It is a right hand tributary of the Adycha, of the Yana basin.

Ammonite fossils of the Jurassic have been found in the river basin.

Course 
The river begins in the southern slopes of the Onelsky Ridge of the Chersky Range. It heads roughly northwestwards through a valley located between the Chibagalakh Range on the northern side and the Borong Range in the southern. Shortly before joining the Adycha it bends southwards and again northwestwards. Finally it joins the Adycha very close downstream from the mouth of the Nelgese, the largest tributary.

The river usually freezes in early October and stays frozen until late May. Its largest tributary is the Dyalyndya on the left.

The village of Ust-Charky is located on the right bank of the Adycha, a little downstream from its confluence with the Charky.

See also
List of rivers of Russia
Yana-Oymyakon Highlands§Hydrography

References

External links
Ammonoids of the Genus Yakutosirenites from the Carnian Stage of Northeast Asia
Ice crust and the neotectonics of northeastern Yakutia
Meteorological stations and hydrological gauges within the study basins

Rivers of the Sakha Republic